Pseudochromis dutoiti is a species of ray-finned fish 
from the Western Indian Ocean: In the north from Pakistan, south to Durban, South Africa which is a member of the family Pseudochromidae.

References

Smith, M.M., 1986. Pseudochromidae. p. 539-541. In M.M. Smith and P.C. Heemstra (eds.) Smiths' sea fishes. Springer-Verlag, Berlin. 

dutoiti
Taxa named by J. L. B. Smith 
Fish described in 1955